Botryoideclava is a small genus of chalcid wasps belonging to the family Aphelinidae.

Partial species list
Botryoideclava bharatiya Subba Rao
Botryoideclava thailandica Hayat, 1994

References

Aphelinidae